Timothy Lawrence Doherty (born September 29, 1950) is an American prelate of the Roman Catholic Church.    He was a priest of the Diocese of Rockford in Illinois until he was appointed Bishop of Lafayette in Indiana by Pope Benedict XVI on May 12, 2010.  On July 15, 2010, Doherty was consecrated, becoming the sixth bishop of the diocese.

Biography

Early life and education
Timothy Doherty was born on September 29, 1950. in Rockford, Illinois, the eldest of seven children of Lawrence and June Doherty.  He attended St. Mary Minor Seminary in Crystal Lake, Illinois, from 1964 to 1968. He then attended St. Ambrose University in Davenport, Iowa, where he earned a Bachelor of Arts degree in 1972. Doherty studied for the priesthood in Rome at the Pontifical North American College and the Pontifical Gregorian University, receiving a Bachelor of Sacred Theology degree in 1975.

Ordination and ministry
On June 26, 1976, Doherty was ordained a priest of the Diocese of Rockford by Bishop Arthur J. O'Neill. His first assignment was as an associate pastor at the Cathedral of St. Peter Parish in Rockford, where he remained for five years. He then furthered his studies in Rome at the Pontifical Lateran University, where he earned a Licentiate of Sacred Theology in moral theology from the Alfonsian Academy in 1982.

Following his return to Illinois, Doherty taught religious studies at Boylan Catholic High School in Rockford from 1982 to 1986. He served as assistant principal and head of the religion department at Marian Central Catholic High School in Woodstock, Illinois, from 1986 to 1991. Then beginning his doctoral studies at Loyola University Chicago, he received a Doctor of Philosophy degree in Christian Ethics in 1995. That same year, he was appointed diocesan ethicist for health care issues, a position which he continues to hold. From 1996 to 1999, he was an associate pastor at Saint Anthony College of Nursing in Rockford, teaching courses in theology and health care ethics.

In 1999, Doherty was named as parochial administrator of St. James Parish in Lee, Illinois. He then served as pastor of St. Mary Parish in Byron, Illinois, from 1999 to 2007. After 2007, he became pastor of both St. Catherine of Siena Parish in Dundee, Illinois, and St. Mary Mission Parish in Gilberts, Illinois.

Bishop of Lafayette
On May 12, 2010, Doherty was appointed as the sixth bishop of the Diocese of Lafayette by Benedict XVI. He succeeded Bishop William Higi, who reached the mandatory retirement age of 75 in August 2008. Doherty received his episcopal consecration from Archbishop Daniel M. Buechlein on July 15, 2010. As bishop, Doherty has served as chairman of the U.S. Conference of Catholic Bishops’ Committee for the Protection of Children and Young People.

On July 1, 2020, Doherty suspended Theodore Rothrock, a priest at St. Elizabeth Seton Parish in Carmel, Indiana, from public ministry. In a Sunday bulletin, Rothrock had describe Black Lives Matter organizers as parasites and maggots.  Rothrock later apologized for his statement.

See also

 Catholic Church hierarchy
 Catholic Church in the United States
 Historical list of the Catholic bishops of the United States
 List of Catholic bishops of the United States
 Lists of patriarchs, archbishops, and bishops

References

External links
Roman Catholic Diocese of Lafayette, IN Official website

Episcopal succession

 

1950 births
Living people
People from Rockford, Illinois
Roman Catholic Diocese of Rockford
St. Ambrose University alumni
Pontifical Gregorian University alumni
Pontifical Lateran University alumni
American Roman Catholic clergy of Irish descent
Roman Catholic bishops of Lafayette in Indiana
21st-century Roman Catholic bishops in the United States
Religious leaders from Illinois
People from Byron, Illinois
Catholics from Illinois